Delvecchio is an American drama television series that aired Sundays at 10:00 pm (EST) on CBS from September 9, 1976, to March 13, 1977. It starred Judd Hirsch as the title character, Dominick Delvecchio, an Italian-American detective who worked for the LAPD and also studied to become a lawyer.

Premise
The title character, a "tough, independent big-city police detective", had graduated from law school but failed the bar examination. His father, a barber, could not understand why Delvecchio chose a career that had him investigating crimes that included auto thefts, murders, and narcotics.

Cast
Judd Hirsch as Sgt. Dominick "Delwop" Delvecchio
Charles Haid as Sgt. Paul "The Fat Polish Sausage" Shonski
Michael Conrad as Lt. Macavan
Mario Gallo as Tomaso Delvecchio

Recurring
Pervis Atkins as Robbie
Jay Varela as Sgt. Rivera
Lew Palter as Det. Clark
George Wyner as Asst. D.A. Dorfman
James B. Sikking as Ned Wangler
James Jeter as Smitty

Schedule
Delvecchio debuted on September 9, 1976, at 9 p.m. Its competition was The Streets of San Francisco on ABC and films on NBC. When it moved to 10 p.m. on September 26, 1976, films formed the competition on both networks. The change in time and date was planned by Bud Grant, vice president for programming at CBS to "whet people's appetites" by launching the show when the competing programming was weaker.

Production 
William Sackheim was the executive producer, and Michael Rhodes was the producer. Directors were Lou Antonio, Walter Doniger, and Ivan Nagy. Steven Bochco wrote for Delvecchio. The series was filmed on location in Los Angeles.

Episodes

Home media
One episode of the Delvecchio series (the Feb. 13, 1977 installment, "Licensed to Kill") was made available on the 2006 DVD release Brilliant But Cancelled TV Dramas, along with an episode each of Gideon Oliver, Johnny Staccato, and Touching Evil.

References

External links 
 

CBS original programming
1970s American drama television series
1976 American television series debuts
1977 American television series endings
Television series by Universal Television
Television shows set in Los Angeles
1970s American crime drama television series